Apomyelois bicolorata is a species of snout moth in the genus Apomyelois. It was described by Boris Balinsky in 1991 and is known from South Africa.

References

Endemic moths of South Africa
Moths described in 1991
Phycitini
Moths of Africa